Bloomington station could refer to:

 Uptown Station, a train station in Normal, Illinois, United States
 Bloomington freight station, a historic freight house in Bloomington, Illinois, United States
 Bloomington GO Station, a train station in Oak Ridges, Ontario, Canada